Guadalupe Muñoz Sampedro (1896–1975) was a Spanish film actress. She was the mother of the actress Luchy Soto.

Her sisters Matilde Muñoz Sampedro and Mercedes Muñoz Sampedro were also both actors.

Selected filmography
 Heart of Gold (1941)
 Stowaway on Board (1941)
 Intrigue (1942)
 Eloisa Is Under an Almond Tree (1943)
 Radio Stories (1955)
 Miracles of Thursday (1957)
 The Last Torch Song (1957)
 The Showgirl (1960)
 Queen of the Tabarin Club (1960)
 Maribel and the Strange Family (1960)
 Television Stories (1965)
 A Decent Adultery (1969)
 The Green Envelope (1971)
 Zorrita Martinez (1975)

References

Bibliography 
 D'Lugo, Marvin. Guide to the Cinema of Spain. Greenwood Publishing, 1997.

External links 
 

1896 births
1975 deaths
Spanish film actresses
People from Madrid